is a Japanese footballer currently playing as a centre back for Hokkaido Consadole Sapporo.

Career statistics

Club
.

Notes

References

External links

1996 births
Living people
Japanese footballers
Association football defenders
J3 League players
J2 League players
J1 League players
Japan Football League players
Thespakusatsu Gunma players
Tegevajaro Miyazaki players
Hokkaido Consadole Sapporo players